Lincoln UTC is a small University Technical College in Lincoln, England which opened in 2014 and specialises in science and engineering. The school is sponsored by the Baker Dearing Educational Trust.

History
The founding principal was Dr. Rona Mackenzie.  She left the UTC after three a half years, in January 2017 and was replaced by Mr Paul Batterbury.  John Morrison has been appointed as Paul Batterbury's successor in September 2017.

For 2014-15 the UTC was located in Chad Varah House on Wordsworth Street.  In September 2015 the UTC moved to a permanent site at the Greestone Centre on Lindum Road. The former girls school and Grade II-listed building underwent a £7.5 million investment and refurbishment, which included the construction of a science and engineering block. The build took eighteen months contractors including Willmott Dixon led by architects JR Roberts.

Curriculum
At Key Stage 4, the students study Two GCSE egivatent specialims a restricted set of GCSE: missing are any languages or any humanities.

Campus and facilities
There are six science laboratories and eight engineering workshops.  Scientific equipment available includes autoclaves, spectrometers, electrophoresis devices, spectrophotometers, laser cutters, milling machines, 3D printers and DNA extraction tools.

Sponsors
The UTC's principal partners are Siemens, the University of Lincoln and Lincoln College.  With other partners including Branston, RAF, North Kesteven District Council, Great Plains, Cummins, RWE, Eminox, Luxus, James Dawson and Morgan Tucker.

References

External links

2014 establishments in England
Educational institutions established in 2014
Schools in Lincoln, England
Secondary schools in Lincolnshire
University of Lincoln
University Technical Colleges